General elections were held in Trinidad and Tobago on May 24, 2010. The date of the general elections was announced by Prime Minister Patrick Manning on April 16, 2010, via a press release. The election was called over two years earlier than required by law. Polls showing that the UNC-led opposition coalition was likely to win the election were confirmed by the subsequent results.

With preliminary results showing the People's Partnership coalition likely to win a majority of 29 out of a possible 41 seats, Patrick Manning conceded defeat on election night. The final outcome has the People's Partnership winning 29 seats, and the PNM winning 12 seats. As a consequence of the People's Partnership's win, Kamla Persad-Bissessar of the People's Partnership coalition was elected Trinidad and Tobago's first female Prime Minister.

In 2015, former minister and international football executive Jack Warner alleged financial connections between himself, world football and the conduct of the 2010 general election.

Background
The 2007 general elections awarded 26 of the 41 seats in the House of Representatives to the People's National Movement (PNM) and 15 to the United National Congress-Alliance (UNC-A). Despite receiving almost 23% of the votes cast, the Congress of the People (COP) received no seats. Several smaller parties, including the Tobago United Front/Democratic Action Congress, also failed to secure any seats. PNM leader Patrick Manning retained the position of Prime Minister, while UNC-A leader Basdeo Panday remained Leader of the Opposition.

These were the first elections for a House which had been expanded from 36 seats to 41. Previous elections were mostly decided by five marginal seats—Barataria/San Juan, Mayaro, San Fernando West, St. Joseph and Tunapuna. The 2007 election raised the number of marginal seats to 10, with Chaguanas East, Lopinot/Bon Air West, Princes Town South/Tableland (renamed Moruga/Tableland for the 2010 election), Pointe-à-Pierre and Tobago East ending up among the marginals.

Screening
April 7, 2010, was the start of screening of 41 new candidates for the People's National Movement. The screening began in Manning's San Fernando East constituency, with the other 40 electoral districts following. April 13, 2010, was the start of screening for the United National Congress. Screening for the UNC-A is held at the party's headquarters, which is at the Rienzi Complex in Couva. Screening for the Congress of the People began on April 1, 2010. Nomination day for the election was May 3, 2010.

Candidates
Winning candidates are in bold.

Conduct
In 2015, former minister and football executive Austin "Jack" Warner said that he had documents linking the outcome of the general election with himself and the finances of football's world governing body, FIFA.

Warner made the claims in a paid national television political broadcast, saying that his life was in danger, that he had given the documents to lawyers, and, "I will no longer keep secrets for them who actively seek to destroy the country."

Results
The election was won by the People's Partnership coalition, causing Kamla Persad-Bissessar of the UNC to be the country's first female Prime Minister. Persad-Bissessar's coalition won 29 of 41 seats, causing incumbent Prime Minister Patrick Manning to concede defeat. Manning's PNM was reduced to 12 seats. In her victory speech, Persad-Bissessar stated: "The honor you've given me is without parallel ... I accept it with deep honor and gratitude."

References

Elections in Trinidad and Tobago
Trinidad
General election